The inauguration of Carlos P. Garcia as the eighth President of the Philippines occurred on March 18, 1957, under extraordinary circumstances. The inauguration marked the commencement of the first term (which lasted nine months and thirteen days) of Carlos P. Garcia as President, following the 1957 Cebu Douglas C-47 crash causing the death of President Ramon Magsaysay.

1957 in the Philippines
Presidency of Carlos P. Garcia
Garcia, Carlos
Malacañang Palace